Tatyana Albertovna Arntgolts (Russian: Татья́на Альбе́ртовна Арнтго́льц; born 18 March 1982) is a Russian theater and film actress, and TV presenter.

Biography
Twin sisters  Tatyana  and Olga were born in Kaliningrad, Russian SFSR, Soviet Union in a family of actors of the Kaliningrad Regional Drama Theater: Honored Artist of the RF Albert Arntgolts and actress Valentina Arntgolts (née Galich). Olga Arntgolts, an identical twin sister, is also an actress. Together they studied at M.S. Schepkin Higher Theatre School in Moscow.

In 2008, Tatyana married actor Ivan Zhidkov. In September 2009, she gave birth to daughter Maria in Moscow. In the summer of 2013 the couple divorced.

Career
In 1999 Arntgolts made her acting debut in the youth drama series Prostiye istiny (The Simple Truth), in which she played student Katya Trofimova.

In 2008 Arntgolts participated in the Channel One show Lednikoviy Period (Ice Age), where celebrities paired with professional figure skaters and each week competed by performing ice dancing routines. Her partner was Maxim Staviski.

Filmography

Theater
 Fairy-Tales Of Old Arbat — as Viktosha — based on the play of the same name written by Alexey Arbuzov, directed by Olga Shvedova
 Tricks of the old goat — as Sasha — written by Vitaliy Krym, directed by Olga Shvedova
 Let sleeping dogs lie — as Betty Whitehouse — based on J. B. Priestley's play Dangerous Corner, directed by Olga Shvedova
 Five Evenings — as Katya — written by Alexander Volodin, directed by Olga Anochina
 Two for the Seesaw — as Gitel Mosca — based on the play of the same name written by Villiam Gibson, directed by Alexey Kiryushenko 
 The Crossroads Of Love — as Shura — based on the play Faryatev's Fantasies written by Alla Sokolova, directed by Rodion Obchinnikov

References

External links

 Kino-teatr.ru
 Kinopoisk.ru
 Ruskino.ru

    Project Pure gold
Project The Swallow’s Nest
         Project Victoria
                   Short film The Monk

1982 births
People from Kaliningrad
Living people
Russian film actresses
Russian television actresses
Russian stage actresses
21st-century Russian actresses